Larry Coleman might refer to

 Larry Coleman (composer)
 Larry Coleman (motorcyclist)